Stromatopteris is a genus of fern in the family Gleicheniaceae, endemic to New Caledonia. The only species in the genus is Stromatopteris moniliformis. Its closest relative is the more widespread genus Gleichenia.

References

Gleicheniales
Monotypic fern genera